Johnstone Creek Provincial Park is a provincial park in British Columbia, Canada, located west of the confluence of Rock Creek and the Kettle River and the town of Rock Creek.  The park has a roughly 38 hectare area, and is near to the Crowsnest Highway.

References

Provincial parks of British Columbia
Boundary Country
1956 establishments in British Columbia
Protected areas established in 1956